Kim Dae-jin (born April 30, 1977), also known by his stage name Na Yoon is a South Korean actor.

Filmography

TV series

References 

South Korean male actors
1977 births
Living people
South Korean male television actors